Michael F. Steger is a professor of psychology at Colorado State University and founder and director of its Center for Meaning and Purpose. His research focuses on the topics of meaning, purpose in life and meaningful work.

He developed the widely used psychological measures the Meaning in Life Questionnaire (cited 4260 times, according to Google Scholar) and the Work and Meaning Inventory. (Cited 1333 times, according to Google Scholar.)

Steger received his PhD with specializations in Counseling Psychology and Personality Psychology from the University of Minnesota in 2005.

Steger has written or edited three books:
Designing Positive Psychology: Taking Stock and Moving Forward
Purpose and Meaning in the Workplace
The Wiley Blackwell Handbook of the Psychology of Positivity and Strengths-Based Approaches at Work

and writes a blog for Psychology Today. He is a member of the board of directors for the International Positive Psychology Association.

References 

Colorado State University faculty
Living people
Year of birth missing (living people)
21st-century American psychologists
University of Minnesota alumni